The Latinization of Bunky Green is an album by saxophonist Bunky Green recorded in Chicago and released by the Cadet label in 1967.

Track listing 
All compositions by Edith Green, except where indicated.
 "Do It Like You Feel It" – 6:12
 "How's Your Mambo?" – 5:55
 "Feeling Good" (Leslie Bricusse, Anthony Newley) – 6:15
 "Guajira Con Cha-Cha-Cha" (Vitin Santiago) – 6:33 
 "A-Ting-a-Ling" (Phil Wright) – 4:27
 "Song for My Parents" – 4:57
 "Let Me Go" – 6:08
 "Fast 'n' Foxy" – 5:43

Personnel 
Bunky Green - alto saxophone, varitone
Arthur Hoyle – trumpet
Larry Boyle – trombone
Bob Ojeda – valve trombone
Antonio Castro – piano
Tony LaRosa – bass
Willie Negron – congas 
Vitin Santiago – oijdo 
Manuel Ramos – timbales
The Dells – vocals

References 

1967 albums
Cadet Records albums
Bunky Green albums
Albums produced by Esmond Edwards